Greatest Hits is a compilation album by Australian hard rock band The Angels, released in November 2011. Greatest Hits peaked at number 26 on the ARIA Charts. It was certified platinum by the Australian Recording Industry Association in 2015.

The album includes nine live songs: "Am I Ever Gonna See Your Face Again", "Comin' Down", "Take a Long Line", "I Ain't the One", "Marseilles", "After the Rain", "Be with You", "Shadow Boxer" and "Mr Damage". A deluxe version was released simultaneously containing a DVD with 39 videos by the band.

Track listing

Personnel 

 Chris Bailey – bass guitar
 Graham "Buzz" Bidstrup – drums
 John Brewster – guitar
 Rick Brewster – rhythm guitar
 Doc Neeson – lead vocals
 Bob Spencer - rhythm guitar, backing vocals
 James Morley - bass guitar, backing vocals
 Brent Eccles - drums
 Grin Creative – design

Charts

Certifications

References 

2011 greatest hits albums
The Angels (Australian band) compilation albums